Dewana Tughal Khel is a town located within the Bannu District of the Khyber Pakhtunkhwa province in Pakistan.

References

Populated places in Bannu District